The Gould GR37 is an open-wheel race cars, designed, developed, and built by British company Gould Racing, specifically for the British Sprint Championship, since 1994.

References 

Open wheel racing cars